James Roy Crabb (August 23, 1890 – March 30, 1940) was a Major League Baseball pitcher. He pitched part of one season, in the majors. He made his major league debut in August for the Chicago White Sox, and ten days later his contract was sold to the Philadelphia Athletics, where he finished the season.  Crabb worked as a painter for the nine years prior to his premature death at age 49 of lung cancer.

Sources

References

Major League Baseball pitchers
Chicago White Sox players
Philadelphia Athletics players
Davenport Prodigals players
Los Angeles Angels (minor league) players
Omaha Rourkes players
Oakland Oaks (baseball) players
Peoria Distillers players
Baseball players from Iowa
1890 births
1940 deaths
People from Monticello, Iowa
Deaths from lung cancer
Deaths from cancer in Montana